Charles Blavette (24 June 1902 – 21 November 1967) was a French film actor. He appeared in 50 films between 1933 and 1966.

Selected filmography

 Jofroi (1934) - Antoine
 Angèle (1934) - Tonin
 Toni (1935) - Antonio Canova / Toni
 Cigalon (1935) - Le Gendarme
 Life Belongs to Us (1936) - Tonin
 Harvest (1937) - Jasmin
 La Marseillaise (1938) - Un Marseillais
 Les filles du Rhône (1938) - Sergent de ville
 The Strange Monsieur Victor (1938) - Le premier inspecteur
 The Baker's Wife (1938) - Antonin
 The Last Turning (1939) - Un camionneur
 The Well-Digger's Daughter (1940) - Le teinturier
 Parade en 7 nuits (1941) - (uncredited)
 Stormy Waters (1941) - Gabriel Tanguy
 Twisted Mistress (1942) - Casimir
 Simplet (1942) - Malandran
 Le soleil a toujours raison (1943)
 Après l'orage (1943)
 La bonne étoile (1943) - Le pêcheur
 Summer Light (1943) - Vincent
 Le val d'enfer (1943) - Cagnard
 Cecile Is Dead (1944) - Monfils
 The Island of Love (1944) - Le contrebandier
 Naïs (1945) - Honoré Bernier l'ingénieur
 Le charcutier de Machonville (1947) - Le bouliste niçois
 Quai des Orfèvres (1947) - Le gendarme Poitevin
 Colomba (1948)
 The Lovers Of Verona (1949) - Le patron de la verrerie
 L'Épave (1949) - Raymond la Douleur
 Prélude à la gloire (1950) - Le caissier
 Manon des sources (1952) - Pamphile, le menuisier
 Carnaval (1953) - Lambrequin
 Le club des 400 coups (1953) - Le garde
 Dangerous Turning (1954)
 House on the Waterfront (1955) - Un homme du 'Goéland' (uncredited)
 The Wicked Go to Hell (1955) - Le pompiste
 Girl and the River (1958) - L'oncle Simon
 Toi, le venin (1958) - L'inspecteur de police
 Archimède le clochard (1959) - Le gendarme cannois (uncredited)
 Picnic on the Grass (1959) - Gaspard
 Eyes Without a Face (1960) - L'homme de la fourrière (scenes deleted)
 Classe Tous Risques (1960) - Bénazet
 The Long Absence (1961) - Fernand
 La Vendetta (1962) - Sosthène
 Sun in Your Eyes (1962)
 Mon oncle du Texas (1962) - Le père
 Le glaive et la balance (1963)
 Le roi du village (1963)
 Dis-moi qui tuer (1965) - Un poivrot
 The Gardener of Argenteuil (1966) - M. Arnaud

References

External links

1902 births
1967 deaths
French male film actors
Male actors from Marseille
20th-century French male actors